Beijing Zion Church was a Protestant church founded in Beijing in 2007 by the pastor Jin Mingri. The church is considered very influential in China with Shouwang Church of Beijing, which has also a pastor with the same surname, Jin Tianming (not related). Zion Church grew to over a 1,000 in a few years. However, the church was closed by the authorities in 2018 with its pastor under house arrest.

Before it was shuttered, it "operated with relative freedom for years, hosting hundreds of worshippers every weekend in an expansive, specially renovated hall in north Beijing".

References

21st-century churches in China
Churches in Beijing
Former churches in China
Protestant churches in China